Jean-Alfred Villain-Marais (11 December 1913 – 8 November 1998), known professionally as Jean Marais, was a French actor, film director, theatre director, painter, sculptor, visual artist, writer and photographer. He performed in over 100 films and was the muse and lover of acclaimed director Jean Cocteau. In 1996, he was awarded the French Legion of Honor for his contributions to French Cinema.

Early life
A native of Cherbourg, France, Marais was a son of Alfred Emmanuel Victor Paul Villain-Marais and his wife, the former Aline Marie Louise Vassord.

Career

Early films
Marais' first role was an uncredited bit in Song of the Streets (1933) and he was in Etienne (1933). Filmmaker Marcel L'Herbier put him in The Sparrowhawk (1933) with Charles Boyer; The Scandal (1934), with Gaby Morlay; Happiness (1934) again with Boyer, The Venturer (1934) with Victor Francen; The New Men (1934) with Harry Baur; and Nights of Fire (1937) with Morlay and Francen.

Marcel Carné gave Marais a small role in Bizarre, Bizarre (1937) and the actor was in Abused Confidence (1937) by Henri Decoin; The Patriot (1938), a biopic of Paul I of Russia with Baur, directed by Maurice Tourneur; and Remontons les Champs-Élysées (1938) directed by Sacha Guitry.

Jean Cocteau
These were small roles. Marais also appeared on stage. He was in a 1937 stage production of Oedipe directed by Charles Dullin, where he was seen by Jean Cocteau. Marais impressed Cocteau, who cast the actor in his play Les Chevaliers de la table ronde.

Marais appeared in Cocteau's play Les Parents terribles (1938), supposedly based on Marais' home life, which was a great success.

Marais had bigger film parts in The Pavilion Burns (1941) directed by Jacques de Baroncelli, and The Four Poster (1942) directed by Roland Tual.

On stage he appeared in La Machine à ecrire (1941) by Cocteau and he directed and designed Racine's Britannicus (1941). He performed briefly with the Comédie-Française, then left acting for a time for fight in Alsace with the Free French Forces, winning the Croix de Guerre.

Stardom
Marais' first film as leading man was L'Éternel retour (1943), a re-telling of Tristan and Isolde set in 1940s France, written by Jean Cocteau. It was directed by Jean Delannoy and co-starred Madeleine Sologne. It was popular and made him a star.

Marais was the male lead in Voyage Without Hope (1943) with Simone Renant directed by Christian-Jaque.

Christian-Jaque also directed Marais in Carmen (1944) with Viviane Romance. This was one of the most popular films in France when it was released.

Beauty and the Beast and Jean Cocteau
Marais became a star in Beauty and the Beast (1946), written and directed by Cocteau.

He performed in a popular revival of Cocteau's 1938 play Les Parents terribles on stage.

Marais' next films were The Royalists (1947), a historical adventure film directed by Henri Calef from a novel by Balzac; and Ruy Blas (1948) with Danielle Darrieux, from a play by Victor Hugo and script by Cocteau, directed by Pierre Billon.

Marais' second film with Cocteau as director was The Eagle with Two Heads (1948) with Edwige Feuillère. He did To the Eyes of Memory (1948) with Michele Morgan for director Jean Delannoy, a big commercial success, then Les Parents Terribles (1949) for Cocteau again.

Marais was reunited with Delannoy for The Secret of Mayerling (1949), about the Mayerling incident. He did Orpheus (1950) with Cocteau, which was soon regarded as a classic.

Post-Cocteau stardom
Marais and Morgan were in The Glass Castle (1950) directed by René Clément. Marais did two films for Yves Allegret: Miracles Only Happen Once (1951) with Alida Valli and Leathernose (1952).

Marais was in L'appel du destin (1953) for Georges Lacombe; The Lovers of Midnight (1953) for Roger Richebé; Voice of Silence (1953), an Italian film from G. W. Pabst; Inside a Girls' Dormitory (1953); Julietta (1953) for Marc Allegret with Dany Robin and Jeanne Moreau; the all-star Boum sur Paris (1953); and The Faith Healer (1954).

Marais starred in a version of The Count of Monte Cristo (1954) that was hugely popular. He then made some all-star Guitry films, Royal Affairs in Versailles (1954), Napoleon (1955) (playing Charles Tristan, marquis de Montholon) and If Paris Were Told to Us (1956); School for Love (1955) for Allegret, with a young Brigitte Bardot, a box office flop; Kiss of Fire (1956) for Robert Darène; and The Whole Town Accuses (1956).

Marais did Elena and Her Men (1956) with Ingrid Bergman and Mel Ferrer for Jean Renoir. He followed it with Typhoon Over Nagasaki (1957) with Darrieux; S.O.S. Noronha (1957); White Nights (1957) for Luchino Visconti, with Maria Schell and Marcello Mastroianni; Girl in His Pocket (1958); King on Horseback (1958); Every Day Has Its Secret (1958); and the all-star Life Together (1958).

Swashbuckler star
Marais starred in the swashbuckler Le Bossu (1959), appearing alongside Bourvil and directed by André Hunebelle which was a mammoth hit launched a new stage of his career. He was reunited with Cocteau for Testament of Orpheus (1960). He played Lazare Carnot in the all-star The Battle of Austerlitz (1960), then was reunited with Bourvil and Hunebelle in another swashbuckler, Captain Blood (1960).

He did Princess of Cleves (1961) for Delannoy with Marina Vlady based on a script by Cocteau. It was back to swashbuckling with Captain Fracasse (1961) for director Pierre Gaspard-Huit, and Blood on His Sword (1961) for Hunebelle.

Marais had a supporting role in Napoléon II, l'aiglon (1962) then did some films in Italy: Romulus and the Sabines (1962) with Roger Moore, and Pontius Pilate (1962), where Marais played the title role alongside Jeanne Crain and Basil Rathbone.

He was reunited with Hunebelle for The Mysteries of Paris (1962), then did The Iron Mask (1962) for Decoin.

Spy films and Fantomas
The success of the James Bond films saw Marais cast in an espionage movie, The Reluctant Spy (1963) for director Jean-Charles Dudrumet. He did a comedy, Friend of the Family (1964), then had a huge box office success with Fantomas (1964), playing the villain and hero, under the direction of Hunebelle.
 
In 1963, he was a member of the jury at the 3rd Moscow International Film Festival.

Marais did Ivory Coast Adventure (1965) directed by Christian-Jaque; Killer Spy (1965), directed by Georges Lampin; a sequel to The Reluctant Spy; and Operation Double Cross (1965), a spy film; then a Fantomas sequel, Fantomas Unleashed (1965).

He played Simon Templar in The Saint Lies in Wait (1966) for Christian-Jaque, and a French general in Seven Guys and a Gal (1967), directed by Bernard Borderie. Fantomas vs. Scotland Yard (1967) was the third and final Fantomas, with Hunebelle.

Marais went on to appear in Le Paria (1969); Renaud et Armide (1969), based on a play by Cocteau; and Le jouet criminel (1969), a short.

1970s
After 1970, Marais preferred concentrating on his stage work, and his movie performances became fewer.

His film credits included La provocation (1970); Donkey Skin (1970) with Catherine Deneuve, directed by Jacques Demy; and Robert Macaire (1971) for French TV.

He was in the miniseries Karatekas and co (1973) and Joseph Balsamo (1973), and did the TV movies Vaincre à Olympie (1977) and Les Parents terribles (1980), based on the play by Cocteau.

He directed stage productions of Le bel indifférent (1975) and Les Parents terribles. He took the latter to London in 1978.

Later career
His later work included Emmenez-moi au théâtre; Parking (1985) directed by Demy; Lien de parenté (1986); Les enfants du naufrageur (1992); Dis Papa, raconte-moi là-bas (1993); Les Misérables (1995 film), directed by Claude Lelouch; and Stealing Beauty (1996), directed by Bernardo Bertolucci.

He performed on stage until his 80s, also working as a sculptor. His sculpture Le passe muraille (The Walker Through Walls) can be seen in the Montmartre Quarter of Paris.

In 1985, he was the head of the jury at the 35th Berlin International Film Festival. He was featured in the 1995 documentary Screening at the Majestic, which is included on the 2003 DVD release of the restored print of Beauty and the Beast. Marais appears on the cover sleeve of The Smiths single "This Charming Man".

Personal life
Marais was Jean Cocteau's lover from 1937 to 1947, his muse and longtime friend. After Cocteau's death, Marais wrote a memoir of Cocteau, L'Inconcevable Jean Cocteau, attributing authorship to "Cocteau-Marais". He also wrote an autobiography, Histoires de ma vie, published in 1975. From 1948 until 1959, his companion was the American dancer George Reich. He is rumored to have been among the lovers of Umberto II of Italy.

In spite of being mainly homosexual, in 1942 Marais met and had a two-year liaison with actress Mila Parély, with whom he later performed in Cocteau's Beauty and the Beast. They remained lifelong friends, and since 1976 Parély managed Marais' pottery shop in Paris.

In the early 1960s, Marais adopted a young man, Serge Ayala, who eventually took the name Serge Villain-Marais. This adopted son, who became a singer and an actor, committed suicide in 2012 at age 69 after an inheritance litigation and bouts of loneliness and depression.

Death
Marais died from cardiovascular disease in Cannes, Alpes-Maritimes in 1998. He is interred in the Village cemetery at Vallauris, near Antibes.

In popular culture
The character Tragicomix, in the comic book Asterix the Legionary of 1967, has his characteristics based on Jean Marais.

His life story became the inspiration for the 1980 François Truffaut film The Last Metro.

In 1983, a still shot of him from Jean Cocteau's 1950 film Orphée was featured on the cover of The Smiths' This Charming Man.

Filmography

See also 
 Place Jean-Marais

References

External links

 
 
 Eternel Jean Marais
 
 Jean Marais at the Films de France

1913 births
1998 deaths
French male film actors
French male stage actors
Bisexual male actors
French LGBT actors
French military personnel of World War II
Muses
Burials in France
20th-century French male actors
People from Cherbourg-Octeville
César Honorary Award recipients
20th-century French LGBT people